James Alexander Henshall (February 29, 1836 – April 4, 1925) was an author on fishing. He was known as the "apostle of the black bass". His book Bass, Pike, Perch and other Game Fishes of America (1903) is part of the American Sportsman's Library.

Biography
He was born on February 29, 1836, in Baltimore, Maryland, to James Gershom Henshall and Clarissa Holt. He married Hester Stansbury Ferguson, a botanical collector and notable artist of plants, on June 9, 1854. He died on April 4, 1925, in Cincinnati, Ohio.

References

External links

 
 

1836 births
1925 deaths
Angling writers